1961 Speedway World Team Cup was the second edition of the FIM Speedway World Team Cup to determine the team world champions. 

The final took place in Wrocław, Poland. The World Champion title was won by Poland team (32 pts) who beat Sweden (31 pts), England (21 pts), and Czechoslovakia (12 pts).

Format

Qualification

Nordic Round
 8 June
  Odense

British Round
 R1: 28 June -  Coventry, Brandon Stadium

 R2: 26 July -  London, New Cross Stadium

 R3: 28 July -  Leicester, Leicester Stadium

 R4: 10 August -  Ipswich, Foxhall Stadium

 R5: 14 August -  London, Wimbledon Stadium

Central European Round
 4 August
  Plzeň

East European Round
 July 30
  Rybnik, Rybnik Municipal Stadium

World Final
 3 September
  Wrocław, Olympic Stadium

See also
 Motorcycle speedway
 1961 Individual Speedway World Championship

References

1961
World Team
September 1961 sports events in Europe